M. Karunanidhi was sworn in as Chief Minister of Tamil Nadu on for fifth time after DMK and allies' victory in the 2006 state assembly election, forming the first minority government in the state since the 1952 election. M. Karunanidhi became the 14th Chief Minister of Tamil Nadu due to the election.

Cabinet ministers

References

Further reading 

 

 
Dravida Munnetra Kazhagam
K
2000s in Tamil Nadu
2006 establishments in Tamil Nadu
Cabinets established in 2006
2006 in Indian politics